Saint Tanco (or Tancho, Tanchon, Tatta; died 815) was a Scottish abbot, bishop, and martyr in Germany. He is venerated as a saint in the Catholic Church, with his feast day on 6 February or 15 February depending on the liturgical calendar.

Monks of Ramsgate account

The monks of St Augustine's Abbey, Ramsgate, wrote in their Book of Saints (1921),

Butler's account

The hagiographer Alban Butler ( 1710–1773) wrote in his Lives of the Primitive Fathers, Martyrs, and Other Principal Saints, under February 16,

Ranbeck's account

Aegedius Ranbeck wrote in his Saints of the Order of Saint Benedict (1896),

Notes

Sources

 

Medieval Scottish saints
815 deaths
Roman Catholic bishops of Verden